Harry "Auby" Anderson (c. 1926 – 1996) was a Canadian football player who played for the Calgary Stampeders. He won the Grey Cup with them in 1948. He was a constable with the Calgary Police Service and retired with the rank of Inspector after 33 years.

Anderson was a professional football player with the Calgary Stampeders from 1945 to 1952.

References

1920s births
Canadian football tackles
Calgary Stampeders players
Players of Canadian football from Alberta
Canadian football people from Calgary
1996 deaths